Richard Howe, 1st Earl Howe (1726–1799), was a British naval officer and earl.

Richard Howe may also refer to:

Sir Richard Grobham Howe, 2nd Baronet (1621–1703), English politician
Sir Richard Grobham Howe, 3rd Baronet (1651–1730), English politician
Geoffrey Howe (1926–2015), British Conservative politician
Dick Howe (1912–1959), recipient of the Military Cross
Richard C. Howe (1924–2021), former Utah Supreme Court Justice
Richard Howe (cricketer) (1853–1914), English cricketer

See also
Richard Curzon-Howe (disambiguation)